Kuzyovo is a village in the municipality of Belitsa, in Blagoevgrad Province, Bulgaria. It is located approximately  22 kilometers southeast from Belitsa and 85-90 kilometers southeast from Sofia. As of 2010 it had a population of 272 people. The population is Muslim of pomak origin. A fourth class municipal road connects the village with Belitsa.

References

Villages in Blagoevgrad Province